Qadamgah-e Bi Bi Shahr Banu (also Romanized as Qadamgāh-e Bī Bī Shahr Bānū) is a village in Sarkhun Rural District, Qaleh Qazi District, Bandar Abbas County, Hormozgan Province, Iran. At the 2006 census, its population was 51, in 12 families.

References 

Populated places in Bandar Abbas County